Comte de Flandre (French) or Graaf van Vlaanderen (Dutch) is a Brussels Metro station located in the municipality of Molenbeek-Saint-Jean, in the western part of Brussels, Belgium. It takes its name from the nearby /.

The station opened on 8 May 1981 as part of the Sainte-Catherine/Sint-Katelijne–Beekkant extension of former line 1. Following the reorganisation of the Brussels Metro on 4 April 2009, it is served by lines 1 and 5, which cross Brussels from east to west.

Under the name '16 X Icarus', sixteen apparently flying dolls made of plaster and bronze are suspended from the ceiling at different heights in the station hall and above the platforms. The artwork is by Paul Van Hoeydonck.

References

External links

Brussels metro stations
Railway stations opened in 1981
Molenbeek-Saint-Jean